Kherigarh is an indigenous breed of cattle in India. It originated in the Lakhimpur Kheri district of the state of Uttar Pradesh. They are closely related to the Malwa breed. It is a draught breed; the bulls are used for light draft works.

See also
List of cattle breeds

References 

Cattle breeds originating in India
Cattle breeds
Animal husbandry in Uttar Pradesh